Edward McManus may refer to:
Edward Joseph McManus (1920–2017), American politician and federal judge from Iowa
Edward Patrick McManus (1857–1918), American politician from Iowa